Charles Pranke (born February 8, 1936) is an American former cyclist. He competed in the men's tandem at the 1968 Summer Olympics.

References

1936 births
Living people
American male cyclists
Olympic cyclists of the United States
Cyclists at the 1968 Summer Olympics
Cyclists from Chicago